Shivadi is a village in the Niphad Subdistrict of the Nashik District of Maharashtra, India.

References

Villages in Nashik district